The 2020 American Athletic Conference baseball tournament was a baseball tournament scheduled to be held at Spectrum Field in Clearwater, Florida, from May 19 through 24. The winner of the double-elimination tournament would have received the conference's automatic bid to the 2020 NCAA Division I baseball tournament.

The Tournament has been held since 2014, the first year of the rebranding as the American Athletic Conference.  Since then, Houston and East Carolina have each won the event twice, while Cincinnati and UConn have each won once.

On March 12, 2020, the NCAA cancelled all winter and spring sports competitions due to the coronavirus pandemic, thus cancelling the tournament.

References

Tournament
American Athletic Conference Baseball Tournament
Baseball competitions in Florida
American Athletic Conference baseball tournament
American Athletic Conference baseball tournament
American Athletic Conference baseball tournament
College sports tournaments in Florida